Relcy was an American corporation specializing in mobile search. It was a stealth mode company funded by Sequoia Capital and Khosla Ventures. Relcy was founded by Rohit Satapathy and Nitin Gupta in mid-2013, notably with funding obtained by a cold tweet to Keith Rabois of Khosla Ventures.

The company received both positive and negative criticism for re-attempting a search start-up with Google having dominated the industry for over a decade.

In February 2016, Relcy added a messaging system to its mobile search engine and announced the launch of an Android app.

In June 2016, Relcy announced they were shutting down.

References

2013 establishments in California
2016 disestablishments in California
Companies based in San Francisco
Online companies of the United States
Defunct internet search engines